Mike Tyson vs. Marvis Frazier was a professional boxing match contested on July 26, 1986. The fight took place at the Glens Falls Civic Center in Glens Falls, New York, USA. 

Tyson won the fight via knockout in the first round, attaining victory within thirty seconds. This would prove to be the fastest knockout victory of Tyson’s career.

Fight information

Broadcast information
The Tyson-Frazier fight was carried by ABC as part of its Wide World of Sports anthology series. Jim Lampley was the lead commentator, with Alex Wallau as the analyst.

Background
Tyson had been keeping busy throughout the first two years of his professional career. Entering 1986, he had fought a total of fifteen fights and won each one by knockout, with only one lasting longer than three rounds and eleven ending in the first round. Prior to fighting Frazier, Tyson had fought nine times in 1986 and defeated all but two fighters by knockout, as former championship challenger James Tillis and Mitch Green had taken him to decision victories; he also had initially defeated Jesse Ferguson by disqualification, but the fight result was changed to a knockout. Entering this fight, Tyson was rated #2 in the World Boxing Council’s ratings. 

The son of former world champion Joe Frazier, Marvis was trained by his father and was regarded as an up-and-coming prospect who might some day become the heavyweight champion. Frazier would eventually get a chance to fulfill those predictions, as in only his eleventh professional fight, he challenged for the WBC heavyweight championship against Larry Holmes on November 25, 1983. Holmes, who would later be stripped by the WBC for accepting this fight over a mandatory defense against Greg Page, dominated the younger Frazier and knocked him out in one round. 

Following his loss to Holmes, Frazier rebounded to win his next six fights, including unanimous decision victories over Tillis and future world champion James "Bonecrusher" Smith, to get back into contention. Frazier, however, came into his fight with Tyson as an overwhelming underdog, leading some to criticize his father, manager and trainer Joe for overmatching him.

The fight
Tyson quickly had Frazier on the defensive, using his left jab to back Frazier into the ropes. Frazier then retreated to the corner where Tyson continued to use his left jab before unleashing two consecutive uppercuts, the second of which knocked Frazier unconscious. Tyson then landed several more blows before Frazier fell to the canvas, slumped against the ropes. Referee Joe Cortez began to count to ten, but as Frazier was clearly unresponsive, stopped the count at five and ended the fight. The fight lasted only 30 seconds, and was the quickest victory of Tyson's professional career.

Aftermath
Tyson continued his blistering pace after this fight, taking a fight against Jose Ribalta less than a month after fighting Frazier and then facing Alfonzo Ratliff three weeks after that. He won both of those fights by knockout, with Ribalta lasting until the tenth round and Ratliff the second, setting up his contest against Trevor Berbick in November where he made history and became the youngest heavyweight champion in boxing history. 

Frazier, meanwhile, only fought three more times after Tyson knocked him out. After his last fight in 1988, Frazier became a minister and began working with prisoners through Prison Fellowship International.

References

Frazier
1986 in boxing
Boxing in New York (state)
Sports in Glens Falls, New York
1986 in sports in New York (state)
July 1986 sports events in the United States